In mathematics, the Cayley plane (or octonionic projective plane) P2(O) is a projective plane over the octonions. 

The Cayley plane was discovered in 1933 by Ruth Moufang, and is named after Arthur Cayley for his 1845 paper describing the octonions.

Properties 
In the Cayley plane, lines and points may be defined in a natural way so that it becomes a 2-dimensional projective space, that is, a projective plane. It is a non-Desarguesian plane, where  Desargues' theorem does not hold.

More precisely, as of 2005, there are two objects called Cayley planes, namely the real and the complex Cayley plane.
The real Cayley plane is the symmetric space F4/Spin(9), where F4 is a compact form of an exceptional Lie group and Spin(9) is the spin group of nine-dimensional Euclidean space (realized in F4). It admits a cell decomposition into three cells, of dimensions 0, 8 and 16.

The complex Cayley plane is a homogeneous space under the complexification of the group E6 by a parabolic subgroup P1. It is the closed orbit in the projectivization of the minimal complex representation of E6. The complex Cayley plane consists of two complex F4-orbits: the closed orbit is a quotient of the complexified F4 by a parabolic subgroup, the open orbit is the complexification of the real Cayley plane, retracting to it.

See also
 Rosenfeld projective plane

Notes

References

 
 
 
 
 
Helmut Salzmann et al. "Compact projective planes. With an introduction to octonion geometry"; de Gruyter Expositions in Mathematics, 21. Walter de Gruyter & Co., Berlin, 1995. xiv+688 pp. 

Projective geometry